The 205th Commando Brigade is a commando brigade of the Republic of Korea Army.

Subordinate units
Brigade Command
1st Commando Battalion
2nd Commando Battalion
3rd Commando Battalion
5th Commando Battalion
6th Commando Battalion

Special forces of the Republic of Korea